Doreen Remour Nziwa (born July 4, 1982) is a Kenyan rugby sevens player. She represented Kenya's women's national rugby sevens team at the 2016 Summer Olympics. She was in the Kenyan women's sevens squad that played at the 2016 France Women's Sevens.

References

External links 
 
 Player Profile

Female rugby sevens players
Rugby sevens players at the 2016 Summer Olympics
Olympic rugby sevens players of Kenya
Kenya international rugby sevens players
1982 births
Living people
Kenya international women's rugby sevens players